Raspcontrol is a web-based system monitoring tool designed primarily for the Raspberry Pi but is compatible with Unix like systems too. The source code is open-source.

The control panel allows the end user to manage service such as Apache, SSH and view vital Raspberry Pi/System information over the web.

Raspcontrol is written entirely in the PHP programming language and uses no other system resources but of that used to process the PHP and the HTTP Server. It was developed to take away the need for resource heavy control panels currently available for the low performance Raspberry Pi computer.

Raspcontrol has an inbuilt routing script which allows it to be used without a HTTP Server such as Apache, the script calls a PHP 5.4 development server on port 80 via a shell script.

Criticism

Criticisms were made by members of the Raspberry Pi community about the lack of security regarding root access permissions being assigned to the HTTP Server to allow basic functionality and unsecure password storage in a flat file database. These issues have been rectified in recent releases.

References 

Unix configuration utilities
Web server management software
Perl software